Totmach (also Romanized as Totmāch; also known as Totmāj) is a village in Khorram Dasht Rural District, in the Central District of Kashan County, Isfahan Province, Iran. At the 2006 census, its population was 71, in 40 families.

References 

Populated places in Kashan County